Ögii nuur ("Ogii Lake") is a sum (district) in the east of Arkhangai Province in central Mongolia, near the confluence of the Tamir and Orkhon rivers. The sum is named after Ögii Lake. The administrative center is located some 100 km from Tsetserleg. In 2009, its population was 3,086.

References 

Populated places in Mongolia
Districts of Arkhangai Province